Kara-Döbö or Karadebe is a village in the Chüy District of Chüy Region of Kyrgyzstan. Its population was 1,495 in 2021.

References

Populated places in Chüy Region